Klondike is an unincorporated community in Hall County, in the U.S. state of Georgia.

History
The community took its name from a product produced by the Adams Canning Company.

References

Unincorporated communities in Hall County, Georgia
Unincorporated communities in Georgia (U.S. state)